Kohan-e Sabz (also known as Kahn-e Gījeh (Persian: كهن گيجه)) is a village in Dehaj Rural District, Dehaj District, Shahr-e Babak County, Kerman Province, Iran. At the 2006 census, its population was 261, in 45 families.

References 

Populated places in Shahr-e Babak County